Parkhurst may refer to:

People with the surname
Carolyn Parkhurst (born 1971), American author
Charles Henry Parkhurst (1842–1933), clergyman and social reformer in New York City
Charles Percy Parkhurst (1913–2008), American museum curator who recovered works stolen by Nazis
Charley Parkhurst (1812–1879), American woman who, living as a man, became a stagecoach driver, rancher, and farmer
Christopher F. Parkhurst (1854–1925), Associate Justice of the Rhode Island Supreme Court
Frederic Hale Parkhurst (1864–1921), American politician and governor of Maine
George A. Parkhurst (1841–1890), actor who was on stage the night John Wilkes Booth shot U.S. President Abraham Lincoln at Ford's Theatre
John Parkhurst (c. 1512-1575), English Latin scholar and Anglican cleric who became bishop of Norwich
John Adelbert Parkhurst (1861_1925), American astronomer
Helen Parkhurst (1886–1973), American educator, author, lecturer, and television host
Michael Parkhurst (born 1984), American professional soccer player

Places
Parkhurst, Gauteng, a suburb of Johannesburg
Parkhurst, Isle of Wight, a community northwest of Newport, Isle of Wight, England
HM Prison Parkhurst, a jail
Parkhurst, Queensland, a suburb of Rockhampton, Australia
Parkhurst (Harwood, Maryland), listed on the NRHP in Anne Arundel County, Maryland, USA
Parkhurst (crater), on the moon

Other uses
Parkhurst Products, a Canadian confectionery and picture card company